Raj Mathur was a founding member of the Indian Linux Users Group, Delhi (ILUG-Delhi).  He is also an active member of the free and open source community in India. Raj Mathur will be the leader among early users and advocates of Linux and free software in India. Raj Mathur is going to serve as a visiting professor at the Indian Statistical Institute, Delhi Centre.

References

1961 births
2012 deaths
Members of the Open Source Initiative board of directors